The Coupe de France 1981–82 was its 65th edition. It was won by Paris SG which defeated AS Saint-Étienne in the Final.

Round of 16

Quarter-finals

Semi-finals

Final

References

French federation

1981–82 domestic association football cups
1981–82 in French football
1981-82